The  opened in Sapporo, Hokkaidō, Japan in 1981. In 1979, Sapporo-born sculptor  (1905–1980), donated to the city his studio and gallery, now converted into the Hongō Shin Memorial House, and many of his works. The following year, construction of a new museum began on land purchased adjacent to the Memorial House. The collection includes some 1,800 sculptures, paintings, drawings, prints, and calligraphic works by Hongō Shin, as well as books, tools, and personal items relating to him, and those of other artists collected by him.

See also
Chūō-ku (ward in Hokkaido, Japan)
List of museums in Japan

References

External links

 Hongō Shin Memorial Museum of Sculpture, Sapporo

Museums in Sapporo
Art museums and galleries in Japan
Biographical museums in Japan
Museums established in 1981
1981 establishments in Japan